Aminagar Sarai is a town and a nagar panchayat in Baghpat district in the state of Uttar Pradesh, India. It is the oldest town in the Meerut commissionary area.

Demographics
At the 2001 India census, Aminagar Sarai had a population of 15,255 (males 52%; females 48%). It had an average literacy rate of 59% (61% of males; 39% of females), lower than the national average of 59.5%. 17% of the population was under 6 years of age.

Exact figures for religious populations are not available from the 2011 census. It has three Hindu temples, two Balmiki temples, a few mosques, an idgah, a Jain Digamber temple and a Jain Shwetamber Sthanak.

Climate
Aminagar Sarai has a monsoon influenced humid subtropical climate characterised by hot summers and cooler winters. Summers last from early April to late June during and are extremely hot, with temperatures reaching 49 °C. The monsoon arrives in late June and continues until the middle of September. Temperatures drop slightly, with plenty of cloud cover but with higher humidity. Winters start setting in October and the town then has a mild, dry winter season from late October to the middle of March. The lowest temperature ever recorded is −0.4 °C (31.3 °F), recorded on 6 January 2013. Most of the rainfall is received during the monsoon. Humidity varies from 30 to 100%. The town receives no snow.

Transport

Air

Road
By road, Aminagar Sarai is  well-connected. A few buses, shared 3-wheelers, e-ricksaws and paddle rickshaws ply from the main road to the town.

There are two main bus terminals, Binuali Stand and Roadways Stand, from where private buses and Uttar Pradesh State Road Transport Corporation buses ply to all nearby villages and cities.

Railways
The nearest railway stations are at Baraut and Baghpat Road railway stations.

References

Cities and towns in Bagpat district
Caravanserais in India